Wadala Depot is a monorail station at which thee Monorail Car Depot is located of the Mumbai Monorail located at Pratiksha Nagar in the Sion suburb of Mumbai, India. It was opened to the public on 2 February 2014, as part of the first phase of Line 1. 
Wadala Depot is located near the Chunabhatti-Kurla junction of the Eastern Express Highway.

References

Mumbai Monorail stations
Railway stations in India opened in 2014